A large number of languages known only from brief mentions are thought to have been Uto-Aztecan languages, but became extinct without being documented.

San Nicolás (Nicoleño): spoken in California, thought to be a Takic language.
Giamina/Omomil: Kroeber (1907) and Lamb (1964) believe Giamina may constitute a separate branch of Northern Uto-Aztecan, although Miller (1983) is uncertain about this. It was spoken in Southern California.
Vanyume: a Takic language of California
Acaxee (Aiage): closely related to Tahue, a Cahitan language, linked with Tebaca and Sabaibo.
Amotomanco (Otomoaco): uncertain classification, possibly Uto-Aztecan. (See Troike (1988) for more details.)
Cazcan (Caxcan): sometimes considered to be the same as Zacateca, although  would only consider these to be geographical classifications.
Baciroa: closely connected to Tepahue
Basopa
Batuc: possibly an Opata dialect
Cahuimeto
Cahuameto: probably belongs with Oguera and Nio
Chínipa: may be a Tarahumaran language close to Ocoroni, since colonial sources claim the two are mutually intelligible. It may also instead be a local name for a variety of Guarijío.
Coca: spoken near Lake Chapala.
Colotlan: a Pimic language closely related to Tepehuan, or Teul and Tepecano
Comanito: a Taracahitic language closely related to Tahue
Concho: probably a Taracahitic language (Troike 1988). Subdivisions include Chinarra and Chizo; Toboso is possibly related to Concho as well.
Conicari: a Taracahitic language closely related to Tahue
Guachichil: possibly a variant or close relative of Huichol
Guasave: possibly a Taracahitic language, or may instead be non-Uto-Aztecan language possibly related to Seri due to the speakers' maritime economy (Miller 1983). Dialects include Compopori, Ahome, Vacoregue, and Achire.
Guazapar (Guasapar): probably a Tarahumara dialect, or it may be more closely related to Guarijío and Chínipa. Guazapar, Jova, Pachera, and Juhine may possibly all be dialects of Tarahumara.
Guisca (Coisa)
Hio: possibly a Taracahitic language
Huite: closely related to Ocoroni, and may be Taracahitic
Irritila: a Lagunero band
Jova (Jobal, Ova): most often linked with Opata, although some scholars classify it as a Tarahumara dialect. Miller (1983) considers it to be "probably Taracahitan."
Jumano; also Humano, Jumana, Xumana, Chouman (from a French source), Zumana, Zuma, Suma, and Yuma. Suma is probably the same language, while Jumano is possibly Uto-Aztecan. (Not to be confused with the Jumana language of Colombia.)
Lagunero: may be the same as Irritila, and may also be closely related to Zacateco or Huichol.
Macoyahui: probably related to Cahita.
Mocorito: a Tahue language, which is Taracahitic.
Naarinuquia (Themurete?): Uto-Aztecan affiliation is likely, although it may instead be non-Uto-Aztecan language possibly related to Seri due to the speakers' maritime economy.
Nacosura: an Opata dialect
Nio: completely undocumented, although it is perhaps related to Ocoroni.
Ocoroni: most likely a Taracahitic language, and is reported to be mutually intelligible with Chínipa, and similar to Opata. Related languages may include Huite and Nio.
Oguera (Ohuera)
Patarabuey: unknown affiliation (Purépecha region near Lake Chapala), and is possibly a Nahuatl dialect.
Tahue: may also include Comanito, Mocorito, Tubar, and Zoe. It is possibly a Taracahitic language, and is definitely not Nahuan.
Tanpachoa: unknown affiliation,  and was once spoken along the Río Grande.
Tecuexe: speakers were possibly part of a "Mexicano" (Nahua) colony.
Teco-Tecoxquin: an Aztecan language
Tecual: closely related to Huichol. According to Sauer (1934:14), the "Xamaca, by another name called Hueitzolme [Huichol], all ... speak the Thequalme language, though they differ in vowels."
Témori: may be a Tarahumara dialect.
Tepahue: possibly a Taracahitic language. Closely related languages or dialects include Macoyahui, Conicari, and Baciroa.
Tepanec: an Aztecan language.
Teul (Teul-Chichimeca): a Pimic language, possibly of the Tepecano subgroup.
Toboso: grouped with Concho.
Topia: perhaps the same as Xixime (Jijime).
Topiame: possibly a Taracahitic language.
Totorame: grouped with Cora.
Xixime (Jijime): spoken by the Xiximes, possibly a Taracahitic language. Subdivisions are Hine and Hume. Its links with Acaxee are uncertain.
Zacateco: often considered the same as Acaxee, although this is uncertain. It is possibly related to Huichol, although Miller (1983) leaves it as unclassified.
Zoe: possibly a Taracahitic language, with Baimena as a subdivision. It is possibly affiliated with Comanito.

References

Bibliography
 
 
 

Uto-Aztecan
Uto-Aztecan languages